Mococa  is a municipality in the state of São Paulo in Brazil. The population is 68,980 (2020 est.) in an area of 855 km². The elevation is 645 m.

The local government is made up of a mayor (in Brazil, Prefeito) and a municipal council (in Brazil, Câmara Municipal.) The current mayor is Eduardo Ribeiro Barison, from the PSD, who was elected in the 2020 municipal elections.

References

External links

 Official page